David Concha Salas (born 20 November 1996) is a Spanish former professional footballer who played as a right winger or forward.

Club career
Born in Santander, Cantabria, Concha joined Racing de Santander's youth setup at the age of 9 following a brief stint with lowly CD Marina Sport. He was called up to train with the main squad in December 2013, being also selected for the Copa del Rey match against Sevilla FC. He made his first-team debut on the 6th, coming on as a substitute for Javi Barrio in the 0–1 home loss. 

Concha made his league debut four days later, again coming from the bench in a 1–0 home win over UD Logroñés in the Segunda División B. On 8 January 2014 he scored his first goal as a senior, helping to a 1–1 home draw against UD Almería also in the domestic cup. He finished the season with 13 appearances, with Racing returning to Segunda División at the first attempt.

On 24 August 2014, Concha played his first match as a professional, starting in a 1–0 defeat at Girona FC. He scored his first goal in the division on 21 September, the first in a 2–2 home draw with CD Leganés.

On 4 July 2015, Concha signed a five-year contract with La Liga club Real Sociedad after suffering relegation. On 31 August, he was loaned to CD Numancia for one year.

Concha made his top-flight debut on 21 August 2016, starting in a 0–3 home loss to Real Madrid. The following 11 August, he was loaned to FC Barcelona B in the second division for one year, but his loan was cut short on 31 January 2018.

On 9 March 2019, after more than one year of inactivity, Concha moved abroad for the first time in his career after agreeing to a one-year loan deal with Gamba Osaka. On 27 February 2020, after only two competitive appearances, he returned to Spain and joined to CD Badajoz on a short-term contract.

On 6 July 2022, Concha signed a two and a half-year contract with Swedish Allsvenskan club Hammarby IF. He made 13 competitive appearances for Hammarby, helping the side to finish 3rd in the 2022 Allsvenskan table. On 25 January 2023, it was announced that Concha left the club by mutual consent to end his professional career.

International career
On 16 May 2014, Concha was called up to the Spain under-19 team.

Honours
Spain U19
UEFA European Under-19 Championship: 2015

References

External links
FC Barcelona official profile

1996 births
Living people
Spanish footballers
Footballers from Santander, Spain
Association football wingers
Association football forwards
La Liga players
Segunda División players
Segunda División B players
Tercera División players
Primera Federación players
Allsvenskan players
Rayo Cantabria players
Racing de Santander players
Real Sociedad footballers
CD Numancia players
FC Barcelona Atlètic players
CD Badajoz players
Gamba Osaka players
Hammarby Fotboll players
Spain youth international footballers
Spanish expatriate footballers
Expatriate footballers in Japan
Spanish expatriate sportspeople in Japan
Spanish expatriate sportspeople in Sweden